Aurora Glacier is a large glacier draining that part of Ross Island between Mount Erebus and Mount Terra Nova, and flowing south into McMurdo Ice Shelf. It was named by A.J. Heine in 1963 after the Aurora, the ship of the Ross Sea Party of the British expedition under Ernest Shackleton, 1914–17.

See also
 List of glaciers in the Antarctic
 Glaciology

References
 

Glaciers of Ross Island